Esther Mombo (born 1957) is a Kenyan Anglican theologian who teaches church history and theologies from women's perspectives.

Biography 
Born in Birongo village of Kisii County, Kenya to a Seventh-day Adventist father and a Quaker mother, Mombo received a BD from St Paul's United Theological College (now St. Paul's University, Limuru) and an MPhil from the Irish School of Ecumenics of Trinity College Dublin. She returned to Kenya to teach at an Anglican bible college, where she became an Anglican herself. Mombo completed a PhD in 1998 at School of Divinity, University of Edinburgh as part of the Centre for the Study of Christianity in the Non-Western World. She wrote her PhD thesis on the topic "A historical and cultural analysis of the position of Abaluyia Women in Kenyan Quaker Christianity: 1902-1979."

Esther is reputed for her exemplary academic prowess in the fight of gender justice as observed in Virginia Theological Seminary awarding her an honorary degree in 2007 for her efforts in bringing gender inequities and gender justice to the forefront of church and society. Since completing her PhD, Mombo has held various administrative posts at St. Paul's University, Limuru, during a period when the institution moved from a theological college to a fully-fledged private ecumenical university.Esther worked in top management at the same university for fifteen years, rising from academic dean to Deputy Vice Chancellor Academic Affairs (2007 to 2013).Esther is a member of numerous ecumenical committees, including the World Council of Churches' Commission on Education and Ecumenical Formation and the All Africa Conference of Churches' Advisor on Education.Previously, she was a member of the Inter-Anglican Doctrinal and Theological Commission. 

She has been involved in work on Christian-Muslim relations in Africa, the Circle of Concerned African Women Theologians. Esther was installed as a Lay Canon Theologian at the Cathedral in 2017,  and has served as a Lay Canon Theologian at Southwark Cathedral. She is currently a Professor of Theology and Director of International Partnerships and Alumni Relations at St. Paul's University, Limuru.

References 

1957 births
Living people
Alumni of Trinity College Dublin
Alumni of the University of Edinburgh School of Divinity
World Christianity scholars
Women Christian theologians
Kenyan Anglicans
Converts to Anglicanism
People from Kisii County